The Trans-Sylvania Mountain Bike Epic is a mountain bicycle stage race in Pennsylvania.  The event is seven days in length and features the rocky, mountainous terrain of central Pennsylvania's multi-use trails.

Race
Also known as:
TransSylvania Epic
Transylvania Epic
TSE
TSEpic

The name Trans-Sylvania is a reference to other mountain bike stage races such as TransRockies and TransAlp.  The Trans-Sylvania Epic differs from these events mainly because it is based out of a central location whereas TransRockies and TransAlp are a continuous route between encampments and towns.  The central location of the base camp relative to the course routes allows for minimal packing, transport, and travel for participants and staff.  Also, compared to other mountain bike stage races, Trans-Sylvania's courses are designed to appeal to a broad spectrum of ability levels as well as catering to upper level professional racers.

The inaugural running of the event was May 30 − June, 2010 and its base camp location is the Seven Mountains Boy Scout Camp near of State College, Pennsylvania. Courses featured areas In Rothrock State Forest, Bald Eagle State Forest, and Raystown Lake. The 2011 Trans-Sylvania Epic was held from May 29 to June 4, 2011.  The base camp location was Also the Seven Mountains Boy Scout Camp, and the stages were modified versions of the 2010 routes. In 2012, the third running started on May 27, and will finish on June 2. It features a short time trial prologue stage, and then 6 Cross country stages that range from a distance of 20 to 45 miles. The feature roads and gravel trails, as well as single and double track.

The number of riders has increased steadily every year, from around 50 in 2010 to 100 in 2011, and to 150 in 2012. The promoters hope to increase the attendance to 250 people within the next two years

Some notable competitors include Jeremiah Bishop, who won the first two years, 2006 world champion Sue Haywood, multi-time national cyclo-cross National Champion Tim Johnson, and mountain biking pioneer Keith Bontrager.

Categories
The categories for racers at the Trans-Sylvania Epic include:

Solo - Open Men
Solo - Open Women
Masters Men 40+
Masters Men 50+ (added in 2011)
Singlespeed Open, known as "Singlespeederific"
Open Tandem (2010 only)
Men's Duo
Co-Ed Duo

Epic Team Category
Epic Teams are a unique feature of this race. They allow people to ride as hard as they want, as often as they want. Teams can have 2–5 members, all Epic Teams compete against each other.  Only one person from each team must finish each day and only the fastest time from each team is counted for each stage. These times are combined for General Classification placement. Another feature of this category is that riders do not have to race every day. As long as one person crossed the line each day, the team is still in the running for GC

Results
2010
Open Men
 Jeremiah Bishop
 Alex Grant
 Brandon Draugelis

Open Women
 Selene Yeager
 Karen Potter
 Rebecca Rusch

"Singlespeederific"
 Greg Martin
 Douglas Jenne
 Rich Dillen

Master Men
 Alec Petro
 Garth Prosser
 Alex Hawkins

2011

Open Men
 Jeremiah Bishop
 Jason Sager
 Kris Sneddon

Open Women
 Amanda Carey
 Selene Yeager
 Vicki Barclay

"Singlespeederific"
 Rich Straub
 Morgan Miller
 Rich Dillen

Master Men 40+
 Garth Prosser
 Rich Oneil
 Bruce Stauffer

Master Men 50+
 Scott Thomson
 James Wilson

Duo
 Team ERRACE: Andrew Caputo and Mark Hixon
 Pisgah Area Cycling: Cissy Fowler and David Cook

Epic Team
 The CO/VA Connection
 Team Saratoga

References

External links
 
 CyclingNews.com Article about Trans-Sylvania Epic
 Trans-Sylvania Productions website

Mountain biking events in the United States